Here's Humphrey was an Australian children's television series produced by Banksia Productions for the Nine Network, which first aired on 24 May 1965 and last went to air in 2009. 

It features an anthropomorphic brown bear character (a person in a costume) known as Humphrey B. Bear, and was produced in Adelaide, South Australia. In September 2013, community station, West TV, began airing repeats of Here's Humphrey in Perth. The character still exists, owned by Ozpix Entertainment as of 2020.

Here's Humphrey became one of the most successful programs for preschoolers in Australia, was sold internationally, and is one of the longest-running children's television programs in the world. The program received multiple Logie Television Awards.

Format
The series features anthropomorphic brown bear character known as Humphrey B. Bear, who is mute. Set in a magical forest, Humphrey is paired with a human presenter, who narrates their adventures. The series takes place in Humphrey's tree house, where he partakes in magical adventures.

One of the central ideas presented in the show is the importance of taking part and not always being successful at everything.

Cast

Presenters
 Patsy Biscoe (1970)
 Ian Fairweather (1967)
 Martin Portus
 Heidi Greig (1988-1992)
 David Sadler (1988-1992)
 Terry Webb (1988-1992)
 Ann Carter (1988-1992)
 Joni Combe (daughter of singer-songwriter Peter Combe) (1995-2000)

Humphrey B. Bear
Several performers portrayed the role of Humphrey.
 Edwin Duryea (1965)
 Ross Hutchinson
 John Maclean
 Tony Balzan (1985 – 2008)

Production
Here's Humphrey was originally aired exclusively in Adelaide on NWS-9, premiering on 24 May 1965, before airing nationally two years later. Filmed in Adelaide and produced by Banskia Productions, the character of Humphrey was initially known as "Bear Bear" until he was renamed as a result of a competition. The program was created as a result of Humphrey's previous popularity on the afternoon program The Channel Niners.Here's Humphrey was granted a P classification, deeming it specifically designed to meet the needs and interests of pre-schoolers and allowing it to be broadcast on the Nine Network with a 30-minute runtime commercial-free. Classification deals allowed the Nine Network to repeat each episode three times.

The Nine Network almost cancelled the series in 2000, which led to protests and comments from the Prime Minister. The network responded to popular public demand and allowed its continuation. The series was commissioned for 180 new episodes in May 2000. New episodes aired until 2003.

In February 2007, Nine commissioned a new series of Here's Humphrey, filming episodes for the first time since 2003. This followed negotiations with the network, after speculation they would not renew the series approaching the end of its contract. The episodes started airing in December 2007 and concluded in 2009 when Banksia Entertainment was wound up.

In September 2019, it was revealed OZPIX were planning to revive Here's Humphrey with a pitch to broadcasters at MIPCOM in France. The production company expressed interest in integrating live action characters with virtual technology. The production team for the project was led by Julie Greene, former executive producer of Hi-5, and included Catherine Martin and Helen Martin, early childhood specialists who also worked on the program. 

 Ozpix Entertainment owns the character, whose "home" is at Village Roadshow Studios on the Gold Coast, Queensland.

Episodes
More than 3,000 episodes of Here's Humphrey have been produced. It has also been stated that only 1,776 episodes were filmed.

Reception
In 2019, TV Week listed Here's Humphrey at #96 in its list of the 101 greatest Australian television shows of all time, which appeared in its monthly TV Week Close Up publication. The magazine said young viewers loved watching Humphrey leave his tree house for adventures in the magic forest.

It has been stated that Here's Humphrey is one of the most successful programs for preschoolers of all time. It is one of the longest running children's programs in the world.

Awards and nominations
The program received multiple Logie Television Awards, and the character won a special "Citizen of the Year" Award at the 1994 Australia Day celebrations.

See also 

 List of Australian television series
 List of longest-running Australian television series

References

External links 
Here's Humphrey official site

1970s Australian television series
1980s Australian television series
1990s Australian television series
1965 Australian television series debuts
2003 Australian television series endings
2007 Australian television series debuts
2008 Australian television series endings
Australian children's television series
Australian preschool education television series
Australian television shows featuring puppetry
Black-and-white Australian television shows
1960s preschool education television series
1970s preschool education television series
1980s preschool education television series
1990s preschool education television series
2000s preschool education television series
English-language television shows
Nine Network original programming
Television series about bears
Television shows set in Adelaide